The McKeen Railmotor was a 6-cylinder self-propelled railcar or railmotor. When McKeen Company of Omaha, Nebraska, U.S.A., first unveiled the car in 1905, the McKeen was among the first engines with a distillate-fueled motor. Revisions to the McKeen car led to the modern self-propelled gasoline rail-motor vehicle, and the "contours of the porthole windows, the front-mounted gasoline engines, and other features anticipated the streamline concept."

Design
William R. McKeen was the superintendent of motive power and machinery at Union Pacific Railroad in 1904 when Edward H. Harriman, the head of UP, began encouraging him to develop the machine. The result of his experiments that year was a "knife-nosed" or "windsplitter" unit that slightly resembled a submarine on wheels, having a distinctive pointed nose, a rounded rear end, center-entry doors and porthole windows. Two lengths, were offered, and both could be configured with either a large mail and express area ahead of the center doors, a smaller mail and express area, or fully fitted with seats, which provided a maximum passenger capacity of 64 or 105 respectively. Cheaper and more powerful than battery-powered vehicles, the McKeen was more flexible than steam locomotives and could operate at competitive speeds.

In Service

Canada
Two McKeen cars were operated by the Alberta and Great Waterways Railroad between Edmonton and Lac La Biche.

United States
The McKeen was popular from 1915 through the 1930s throughout the United States, and the cars were featured on the Union Pacific and the Southern Pacific.

Victoria, Australia

Two McKeen railmotors were purchased by the Victorian Railways, and delivered in 1911. They were used to run the Ballarat to Maryborough and Hamilton to Warrnambool services, and briefly, between March and April 1913, the Maryborough to St Arnaud service.

The railmotors proved to be very unreliable, and only lasted for about three years as self-propelled vehicles. They were de-engined in 1919, and converted to passenger cars numbered as 1 & 2 ABCL, for use on the Altona line. They were scrapped in August 1926.

Queensland, Australia
In June 1911, Queensland Railways ordered five railcars from the McKeen Motor Co. at a cost of £4500 per unit. They were delivered in May 1913 and went into service  with the running numbers one to five. The original seating capacity was 75, but that was later reduced to 69: 55 in the main section and 14 in the "smoker". The mechanical transmission proved to be unreliable and they were expensive to run, costing almost twice as much per mile as a steam-hauled passenger train.

By 1920, Car No 1 was out of commission. Cars No 2 and 5 were modified as Tourist or Day Inspection Cars, which included luxury appointments and seating for 32 passengers. All five units were written-off between 1929 and 1931, and were broken up soon after at the Ipswich workshops.

Withdrawal
The Nevada State Railroad Museum  completed the restoration  of McKeen car, #22 of the Virginia and Truckee Railroad, a  car by 05/09/2010. The original powerplant did not survive, but it was replaced with a modern engine and drive system to allow the car to transport visitors to the museum around its short track.

Model Railways

HO Scale
The McKeen motor car and trailer coach are offered as cast resin kits by Funaro & Camerlengo in Honesdale, Pennsylvania.

Historically McKeen motor cars were imported in brass by Ken Kidder (55' car, unpainted), LMB (55' car, unpainted), Overland Model Imports (OMI) (70' cars, unpainted and factory painted for various road names), and Precision Scale Company (PSC) of Hamilton, MT (70' cars, unpainted and factory painted for various road names).  All these brass importer brands are now defunct.  OMI and PSC also did import McKeen trailer coaches (painted and unpainted) as well.  Only Ken Kidder had one run of McKeen motorcar with an operating flywheel.  The rest of the HO models have the flywheel as static when operating the McKeen motorcar.  Actual McKeen motorcar flywheels were always rotating (in motion) when the motor was operating, and in the direction the motor was running, even if the car was stopped, as the motor direction controlled the direction the motorcar operated.

References

External links
 McKeen Rail Motor Cars Operating Manual from Victorian Railways
 Historic photo

See also
 Lakeside and Marblehead Railroad
 Railroads in Omaha
 Victorian Railways
 Weitzer railmotor, Europe's first railmotor produced in considerable numbers, at the same time as the McKeen Railmotor.

Victorian Railways railmotors
Rail transportation in Nebraska
Railcars of the United States
Rolling stock innovations